Cold Fork is an unincorporated community in Tehama County, in the U.S. state of California.

History
A post office was established at Cold Fork in 1915, and remained in operation until 1920. The community takes its name from nearby Cold Fork creek.

References

Unincorporated communities in Tehama County, California